Robert Klein Dean (born June 10, 1955) is an American former handball player who competed in the 1976 Summer Olympics. He played college football at Northwestern.

Family
He has an identical twin brother named Randy Dean. They played all three sports at all levels together except that Randy played football at a professional level.

Basketball
He played basketball at the Whitefish Bay High School. At the season 1973-74 he played 26 games for the Northwestern University.

Football
He played football for the Whitefish Bay High School. He played from the season 1974 until 1976 for the Northwestern University.

Handball
In 1976 he became third at the USA Team Handball Nationals with the Northwest Suburban YMCA.

In 1976, he and his brother were part of the American team which finished tenth in the Olympic tournament. He played all five matches and scored 11 goals.

See also
Randy Dean

References

External links

 

1955 births
Living people
Players of American football from Wisconsin
Northwestern Wildcats football players
American male handball players
Olympic handball players of the United States
Handball players at the 1976 Summer Olympics
American twins
Sportspeople from Milwaukee
People from Whitefish Bay, Wisconsin
Twin sportspeople
Northwestern Wildcats men's basketball players
Whitefish Bay High School alumni